This is a list of films set on or around Father's Day.

Crime
 Underworld (1996) - an American mob film in which a mobster attempts to solve his father's murder and settle scores on Father's Day

Drama
 Jam (2006), an American film about how various characters spend Father's Day

Horror
 "Father's Day" (1982), a segment of the horror anthology film Creepshow in which a father is killed by his daughter on Father's Day
 Stepfather III (1992), an American slasher film that begins on Easter Sunday and ends on Father's Day
 Father's Day (2011), an American-Canadian action-horror comedy film featuring a character known as the Father's Day Killer
 Knock Knock (2015), an American horror film in which a man stays home alone on Father's Day weekend
 "Father's Day" (2016), a segment of the American horror anthology film Holidays

References

Lists of films set around holidays
Father's Day